Joseph-Alphonse Langlois (September 23, 1860 – May 25, 1927) was a politician Quebec, Canada and a Member of the Legislative Assembly of Quebec (MLA).

Early life

He was born in Quebec City's St. Roch neighbourhood.  He became president of the Société Saint-Jean-Baptiste for the Quebec area.

Political career

Langlois ran as a Labour candidate in the provincial district of Saint-Sauveur in a by-election held on November 12, 1909 and won.  He was re-elected in the 1912 election, but finished third and was defeated against Liberal candidate Arthur Paquet in the 1916 election.

References

1860 births
1927 deaths
Labour Party (Quebec) MNAs